The Queen Mary Wasafiri New Writing Prize (originally known as the Wasafiri New Writing Prize) is an annual award open to anyone worldwide who has not yet published a complete book. It was inaugurated in 2009 to celebrate the 25th anniversary of Wasafiri magazine, to support new writers, with no limits on age, gender, nationality or background. The prize is judged in three categories: Fiction, Poetry, and Life Writing; The winners are published in the print and online magazine.

Award history

2009
The 2009 judges were: Susheila Nasta (Chair), Margaret Busby, Mimi Khalvati and Blake Morrison. The winners were announced by Mimi Khalvati on 31 October at the Purcell Room, South Bank Centre, London, with the winning entries subsequently published in Wasafiri 61, Spring 2010.

Winners
 Fiction: Ola Awonubi for "The Go Slow Journey"
 Poetry: Rowyda Amin for "Monkey Daughter"
 Life Writing: Bart Moore-Gilbert for "Prologue"

2010
The 2010 judges were Susheila Nasta (Chair), Moniza Alvi, Romesh Gunesekera and Marina Warner. The winners were announced on October 14 at Somerset House, London, and the winning entries were published in Wasafiri 65, Spring 2011.

Winners
 Fiction: Jackie McCarrick for "The Visit"
 Fiction: Jane Ryan for "Minding Romiya"
 Poetry: Noel Williams for "The Anthropology of Loss"
 Life Writing: Barbara Jenkins for "It's Cherry Pink and Apple Blossom White"

2011
The 2011 judges were: Susheila Nasta (Chair), Brian Chikwava, Jackie Kay and Daljit Nagra. The winners were announced by Brian Chikwava at Bush House, London, and the winning entries were published in Wasafiri 69, Spring 2012.

Winners

 Fiction: Michael Marett-Crosby for "Room 618"
 Poetry: Richard Scott for "Adin" 
 Life Writing: Abeer Hoque for "On Growing"

2012
The 2012 judges were: Susheila Nasta MBE (Chair), John Haynes, Maya Jaggi, Colin Grant. The winners were announced at Asia House on Wednesday 3 October.

Winners
 Fiction: C. S. Mee for "The Walk"
 Poetry: Sally St Clair for "In the Beginning and the End"
 Life Writing: David Houston for "Wish You Were Here"

2013
The 2013 judges were Susheila Nasta MBE (Chair), Anthony Joseph, Tabish Khair and Beverley Naidoo. The winning entries were published in Issue 77 of Wasafiri in February 2014.

Winners

 Fiction: Gita Ralleigh for "Back at the Museum"
 Life Writing: Cliff Chen for "Life Exchanges"
 Poetry: Anita Pati for "A Concise Chinese-English Dictionary for Stealing Love"

2014
The 2014 judges were Susheila Nasta (Chair), Bidisha, Inua Ellams, Monique Roffey. The winning entries were published in the Spring 2015 issue of Wasafiri.

Winners
 Fiction: Simon van der Velde (UK) for "The Bearer"
 Poetry: Pnina Shinebourne (UK) for "Dot by dot of hurt";  Aria Aber (UK) for "First Generation Immigrant Child" 
 Life Writing: Aurvi Sharma (USA) for "Seeing Double"

2015
The 2015 judges were Susheila Nasta (Chair), Toby Litt, Yasmin Alibhai Brown and Roger Robinson.

Winners
 Fiction: Uschi Gatward for "My Brother is Back"
 Poetry: Amaal Said for "The Girl Grew"
 Life Writing: Louise Kennedy for "A Suitable Family"
Special commendations: Akwaeke Emezi for "Welcome"; Richard Georges for "Bush Tea"; Sarala Estruch for "Saturdays"

2016
The 2016 judges were Susheila Nasta (Chair), Diran Adebayo, Imtiaz Dharker and Vesna Goldsworthy. The winners were published in Wasafiri 89 (Spring 2017).

Winners
 Fiction: Niamh MacCabe for "Nobody Knows the Shivering Stars"
 Poetry: Danielle Boodoo-Fortuné for "Portrait of my father as a grouper"
 Life Writing: Shiva Rahbaran for "Massoumeh: An Iranian Family in Times of Revolution"
Special commendations: H. M. Aziz for "The Cheekovit" (Fiction); Zillah Bowes for "Dogs who like fish" (Poetry); Cheryl Anderson for "Round Yard" (Life Writing)

2017
The 2017 judges were Susheila Nasta (Chair), Sabrina Mahfouz, Andrea Stuart and Boyd Tonkin. The winners were announced  on 19 October at The People's Palace, Queen Mary University of London. 

Winners
 Fiction: Ndinda Kioko for "Some Freedom Dreams"
 Poetry: Mehran Waheed for "Petit Navire"
 Life Writing: Julie Abrams-Humphries for "Crinoline Lady"
Special commendations: "Seven Hells" by Zaid Hassan (Fiction); "What Yung Thug’s Colour Theory Best Describes As An Open Wound Or Open Letter" by Momtaza Mehri (Poetry); "Bentong! Go Back to Bentong!" by Aliyah Kim Keshani (Life Writing)

2018

The 2018 judges were Susheila Nasta (Chair), Elleke Boehmer, Malika Booker and Kerry Young. The winners were announced on 25 October at The Blenheim Saloon, Marlborough House.

Winners
 Fiction: Deidre Shanahan for "Plunder"
 Poetry: Daniella Shokoohi for "In the Garden Where the Gorgons Live"
 Life Writing: Len Lukowski for "Diary of a Teenage Boy"

Special commendations: "The Other Things in the Blood" by IfeOluwa Nihinlola (Fiction); "Babes in the Wood" by Maeve Henry (Poetry); "Feeding Grief to Animals" by Rebecca Parfitt (Life Writing)

2019
The 2019 judges were Susheila Nasta (Chair), Louise Doughty (Fiction), Warsan Shire (Poetry) and Nikesh Shukla (Life Writing).

Winners
 Fiction: Alicia Mietus for "Third Person Female"
 Poetry: Desirée Seebaran for "Picong" 
 Life Writing: Ruby D. Jones for "Natural Causes"

Special commendations: Erica Sugi Anayadike, "How to Marry an African President" (Fiction); Joanna Johnson, "Pantoum of Soldiers" (Poetry); E. S. Batchelor, "Human Resources" (Life Writing)

2020
The 2020 judges were Simon Prosser (Fiction), Raymond Antrobus (Poetry) and Aida Edemariam (Life Writing).
 
Winners
 Fiction: Sharma Taylor (Barbados) for "How You Make Jamaican Coconut Oil"
 Poetry: Yasmine Seale (Turkey) for "Conventional Wisdom" 
 Life Writing: Sharanya Deepak (India) for "Seamless"

Special commendations: Adam Zmith for "Holding on" (Fiction); Emily Pritchard for "Cutting water" (Poetry); Minifreda Grovetszki for "When you think I'm hurrying you but you're taking an eternity over every damn thing" (Life Writing)

2021 
The 2021 judges were Hirsh Sawhney, Christie Watson (Life Writing), Tishani Doshi (Poetry), and Andrew Cowan (Chair).

 Fiction: Kate Carne (UK) for "First to Go"
 Poetry: Dipanjali Roy (India) for "सफ़रनामा / Safarnama"
 Life Writing: Anne O'Brien (Ireland) for "Swallow"

References

External links
Official website

Awards established in 2009
2009 establishments in the United Kingdom
English-language literary awards
Fiction awards
Non-fiction literary awards
Poetry awards
International literary awards